Islay LIMPET was the world's first commercial wave power device and was connected to the United Kingdom's National Grid.

History

Islay LIMPET (Land Installed Marine Power Energy Transmitter) was developed and operated by Wavegen in cooperation with Queen's University Belfast. Following the construction of a 75 kW prototype in 1991, a 500 kW unit was built in 2000 at Claddach Farm on the Rhinns of Islay on the Scottish island of Islay. The capacity was later downgraded to 250 kW.

Technology

Islay LIMPET is a shoreline device using an Oscillating Water Column to drive air in and out of a pressure chamber through a Wells turbine. The chamber of the LIMPET is an inclined concrete tube with its opening below the water level. External wave action causes the water level in the chamber to oscillate. This variation in water level alternately compresses and decompresses trapped air above, which causes air to flow backwards and forwards through a pair of contra-rotating turbines.

Decommissioning
The plant has been decommissioned, and as of 2018 all installations except the concrete construction making up the wave chamber have been removed.

Related installations
Based on this design, a 16-turbine plant was built in the Bay of Biscay in Spain, the Mutriku Breakwater Wave Plant, which was fully operational and handed over to the company in 2011.

Footnotes

External links

 Islay LIMPET wave power plant (Wavegen website)
 LIMPET at Queen's University Belfast

Islay
Buildings and structures in Argyll and Bute
Wave farms in Scotland